Walter Michael Poddubny (February 14, 1960 – March 21, 2009) was a Canadian professional ice hockey left winger and coach who played eleven seasons in the National Hockey League (NHL) from 1981–82 until 1991–92. He played 468 career NHL games, scoring 184 goals and 238 assists for 422 points.

Career
Poddubny was drafted 90th overall by the Edmonton Oilers in the 1980 NHL Entry Draft. He was acquired from the Toronto Maple Leafs by the New York Rangers for Mike Allison on August 18, 1986, in a trade considered to be Phil Esposito's best during his three years as the team's general manager. Poddubny was the leading scorer in each of his only two Rangers campaigns, with 87 points (40 goals, 47 assists) in 1986–87 and 88 (38 goals, 50 assists) the following season. He was the recipient of the New York Rangers Fan Club's Frank Boucher Trophy for the most popular player on and off the ice in both years, and the team's Most Valuable Player Award from the Professional Hockey Writers Association in 1987.

Following a productive season in 1988-89 with the Quebec Nordiques that saw Poddubny score 38 goals in 72 games played, his playing career began to decline from damaged knees.

After his career in the NHL, Poddubny coached several hockey teams including six seasons as head coach of the  Anchorage Aces. Life after the NHL wasn't easy for him, and he once said, "People think if you played in the NHL, you're set for life. It's not like that for everyone."

Poddubny died of a heart attack at the age of 49, after collapsing at his sister's house in Thunder Bay.

Career statistics

Ice hockey

Roller hockey

Coaching

‡ - Midseason Replacement

References

External links

1960 births
2009 deaths
Brandon Wheat Kings players
Canadian ice hockey left wingers
Canadian people of Ukrainian descent
Edmonton Oilers draft picks
Edmonton Oilers players
Ice hockey people from Ontario
Kingston Canadians players
Kitchener Rangers players
Las Vegas Flash players
Milwaukee Admirals (IHL) players
National Hockey League All-Stars
New Jersey Devils players
New York Rangers players
Orlando Rollergators players
Quebec Nordiques players
St. Catharines Saints players
Sportspeople from Thunder Bay
Toronto Maple Leafs players
Utica Devils players
Wichita Wind players
Worcester IceCats players